Viktória Pavuk (born 30 December 1985, in Budapest) is a Hungarian former competitive figure skater. She is a two-time International Cup of Nice champion and the 2011 Hungarian national champion.

Pavuk's first coach was István Simon and she also spent summers training with Igor Tchiniaev. She was later coached by her sister. In December 2012, Pavuk announced her retirement from competitive skating.

Programs

Competitive highlights 
GP: Grand Prix; JGP: Junior Grand Prix

References

External links 

 

1985 births
Living people
Hungarian female single skaters
Olympic figure skaters of Hungary
Figure skaters at the 2006 Winter Olympics
Figure skaters from Budapest
Competitors at the 2009 Winter Universiade